Chief sergeant is a rank used in uniformed organizations, principally military and policing forces.

NATO code
While the rank of chief sergeant is used in a number of NATO countries, it is ranked differently depending on the country.

Insignia of chief sergeants

Army

 Royal Papua New Guinea Constabulary: Chief sergeant.

References

Police ranks
Military ranks